Andrew K. Pace is an American librarian and author. He has served as executive director of the University System of Maryland and Affiliated Institutions (USMAI) Library Consortium since March 2022, after fifteen years working in various leadership positions at OCLC.

Career
From 2008 to 2009 Pace served as president of the Library and Information Technology Association (LITA). He was the author of the "Technically Speaking" column for American Libraries magazine. In 2013 he was elected councilor-at-large for the American Library Association (ALA). In 2016 he was elected to serve a three-year term on the ALA executive board and ran for ALA Treasurer in 2019, losing the election to Maggie Farrell, dean of university libraries at University of Nevada, Las Vegas.

Between 1999 and 2007 Pace was Head of Information Technology for North Carolina State University Libraries. In 2002 Pace was named "Librarian of the Year" at the 15th annual DRA User's Conference. In 2004 Pace was appointed to the leadership team responsible for the coordination and planning of National Information Standards Organization MetaSearch Initiative. Prior working at NCSU he worked at a product manager for Innovative Interfaces, a library software vendor. Between 2007 and 2022, Pace held various leadership positions at OCLC, including Executive Director for Technical Research and Executive Director for Management Services.

He holds a BA in rhetoric and communications studies from the University of Virginia and an MSLS from the Catholic University of America.

Publications
Pace's major work includes the 2003 book, The Ultimate Digital Library: Where the New Information Players Meet. He maintains the blog, Hectic Pace.
"Optimizing Library Web Services: A Usability Approach," Library Technology Reports, v. 38, no. 2 (Chicago: ALA TechSource), 2002
The Ultimate Digital Library: Where the New Information Players Meet (American Library Association, 2003) 
"Toward a Twenty-First Century Catalog," Information Technology and Libraries, 2006 (With Antelman and Lynema)
"21st Century Library Systems," Journal of Library Administration, 2009
"Meeting the E-Resources Challenge through Collaboration," The Serials Librarian, 2015
"Closing the Gap," Serials Review, 2015

References

Living people
American librarians
American Library Association people
American male non-fiction writers
American technology writers
North Carolina State University staff
OCLC people
People in information technology
University System of Maryland people
Year of birth missing (living people)